Óbidos is a municipality in Pará, Brazil located at the narrowest and swiftest part of the Amazon River.  The town was founded in 1697, and is located between Santarém and Oriximiná. It is the seat of the Diocese of Óbidos. The town was named after Óbidos, Portugal.

Conservation

The north of the municipality contains part (7.36%) of the  Grão-Pará Ecological Station, the largest fully protected tropical forest conservation unit on the planet.
It contains 10% of the  Trombetas State Forest, created in 2006.

Transportation
Óbidos is served by Óbidos Airport.

Sobral Santos II disaster

The riverboat was making its weekly trip between Santarém and Manaus and was claimed to be overcrowded when it sank in Óbidos harbour. It is assumed over 300 people died in the disaster, with hundreds of bodies and body parts never identified.

Villages 
 Missão Tiriyó

Climate 
The climate is tropical monsoon (Köppen: Am), with great differences in precipitation according to the seasons.

References

Further reading

 Harris, Mark. Life on the Amazon The Anthropology of a Brazilian Peasant Village. A British Academy postdoctoral fellowship monograph. Oxford: Published for the British Academy by Oxford University Press, 2000. 

''Columbia-Lippincott guide'. (New York City: Columbia University Press, 1952) p. 1362.

Municipalities in Pará
Populated places established in 1697
Populated places on the Amazon
1697 establishments in the Portuguese Empire